The Toarcian is, in the ICS' geologic timescale, an age and stage in the Early or Lower Jurassic. It spans the time between 182.7 Ma (million years ago) and 174.1 Ma.  It follows the Pliensbachian and is followed by the Aalenian.

The Toarcian Age began with the Toarcian Oceanic Anoxic Event, a major anoxic event associated with marine extinctions and increased global temperatures  that sets its fossil faunas apart from the previous Pliensbachian age. It is believed to have ended with a global cooling event known as the Comptum Cooling Event, although whether it represented a worldwide event is controversial.

Stratigraphic definitions
The Toarcian takes its name from the city of Thouars, just south of Saumur in the Loire Valley of France. The stage was introduced by French palaeontologist Alcide d'Orbigny in 1842, after examining rock strata of this age in a quarry near Thouars.

In Europe this period is represented by the upper part of the Lias.

The base of the Toarcian is defined as the place in the stratigraphic record where the ammonite genus Eodactylites first appears. A global reference profile (a GSSP) for the base is located at Peniche, Portugal. The top of the stage is at the first appearance of ammonite genus Leioceras.

In the Tethys domain, the Toarcian contains the following ammonite biozones:
zone of Pleydellia aalensis
zone of Dumortieria pseudoradiosa
zone of Phlyseogrammoceras dispansum
zone of Grammoceras thouarcense
zone of Haugia variabilis
zone of Hildoceras bifrons
zone of Harpoceras serpentinum
zone of Dactylioceras tenuicostatum

References

Sources
; 2004: A Geologic Time Scale 2004, Cambridge University Press.
; 1842: Paléontologie française. 1. Terrains oolitiques ou jurassiques, Bertrand, Paris. 
Elmi, S., Rulleau, L., Gabilly, J. & Mouterde, R. 1997: Toarcien. In: Cariou, E. & Hantzpergue, P. (eds): Biostratigraphie du Jurassique ouest-européen et méditerranéen. Bulletin du Centre des Recherches, Elf Explor. Prod. Mém., 17.

External links
GeoWhen Database - Toarcian
Lower Jurassic timescale, at the website of the subcommission for stratigraphic information of the ICS
Stratigraphic chart of the Lower Jurassic, at the website of Norges Network of offshore records of geology and stratigraphy

 
04
Geological ages